1984 in sports describes the year's events in world sport.

Alpine Skiing
 Alpine Skiing World Cup:
 Men's overall season champion: Pirmin Zurbriggen, Switzerland
 Women's overall season champion: Erika Hess, Switzerland
 At the Winter Olympics, Bill Johnson becomes the first American to win the gold medal in downhill skiing.

American football
 Super Bowl XVIII – the Los Angeles Raiders (AFC) won 38–9 over the Washington Redskins (NFC)
Location: Tampa Stadium
Attendance: 72,920
MVP: Marcus Allen, RB (Los Angeles)
 Walter Payton breaks Jim Brown's rushing record on October 7.
 Philadelphia Stars win United States Football League Championship, 23-3 over Arizona Wranglers
 Orange Bowl (1983 season):
 The Miami Hurricanes won 31-30 over the Nebraska Cornhuskers to win the national championship
 Doug Flutie wins the Heisman Trophy
 November 23 – The Hail Flutie Game
 1984 college football season:
 The Brigham Young Cougars win the national championship following their victory in the Holiday Bowl on December 21

Association football
 European Championship – Final: France 2-0 Spain; Hosts: France
 Asian Cup – Final: Saudi Arabia 2 – 0  P.R. China; Hosts: Singapore
 Champions' Cup – – May 30 – Liverpool 1-1 A.S. Roma; Liverpool won 4-2 on penalties after extra time.
 UEFA Cup – Two legs; 1st leg Anderlecht 1-1  Tottenham Hotspur; 2nd leg Tottenham Hotspur 1-1 Anderlecht; 2-2 on aggregate, Spurs won 4-2 on penalties
 Cup Winners' Cup – Juventus 2-1 Porto
 Super Cup – Juventus 2-0 Liverpool
 Copa Libertadores de América – Two legs; 1st leg Grêmio 0-1 Independiente; 2nd leg Independiente 0-0 Grêmio; Independiente won 1-0 on aggregate
 England – FA Cup – – May 12 – Everton win 2-0 against Watford
 FIFA gives the right to host the 1990 FIFA World Cup to Italy
 The North American Soccer League folds due to financial problems

Australian rules football
 Victorian Football League
 March 31: Carlton 31.13 (199) beat North Melbourne 9.8 (62) at VFL Park. This remains the largest opening round win in League history.
 July 28: On a waterlogged Western Oval, Footscray and Essendon play a goalless first half. It is the first time this has occurred since 1968 and only the second since 1899.
 Essendon wins the 88th VFL Premiership, defeating Hawthorn 14.21 (105) to 12.9 (81) in the Grand Final
 Brownlow Medal awarded to Peter Moore (Melbourne)
West Australian Football League
 May 5: West Perth 15.15 (105) draw with South Fremantle 16.9 (105) at Leederville Oval for the first senior WAFL draw in 888 matches since East Fremantle and Swan Districts each scored 11.14 (80) at East Fremantle Oval on April 21 of 1974. This constitutes the second-longest non-occurrence of draws in a major Australian Rules competition; ironically the only longer one ended with a draw between the same two clubs at the same ground.

Baseball
 January 10 – Luis Aparicio, Harmon Killebrew, and Don Drysdale are elected to the Baseball Hall of Fame
 World Series – Detroit Tigers win 4 games to 1 over the San Diego Padres

Basketball
 Donald Sterling relocates the San Diego Clippers to Los Angeles.
 NCAA Men's Basketball Championship –
 Georgetown wins 84-75 over Houston
 NCAA Division I Women's Basketball Championship
 University of Southern California(USC) wins 72–61 over Tennessee
 NBA Finals –
 Boston Celtics won 4 games to 3 over the Los Angeles Lakers
 National Basketball League (Australia) Finals:
 Canberra Cannons defeated the Brisbane Bullets 84-82 in the final.
 Central Missouri State University won the NCAA Division II men's and women's basketball titles, becoming the first school ever in any division to accomplish the feat. The University of Connecticut would do the same in Division I in 2004.
 NBA Draft –
A new era in the NBA is born on June 23 with the drafting of Houston's Hakeem Olajuwon, North Carolina's Michael Jordan, Auburn's Charles Barkley and Gonzaga's John Stockton.

Boxing
 March 31 – Wilfredo Gómez defeats Juan Laporte by a decision in 12 rounds to conquer the WBC's world Featherweight crown.
 June 15 – in the most anticipated bout of the year, Thomas Hearns, WBC world Jr. Middleweight champion, knocks out WBA world champion Roberto Durán in two rounds. The WBA elects not to sanction the bout, declaring their version of the title vacant instead.

Canadian football
 Grey Cup – Winnipeg Blue Bombers won 47–17 over the Hamilton Tiger-Cats
 Vanier Cup – Guelph Gryphons won 22–13 over the Mount Allison Mounties

Cricket
 Inaugural edition of the Asia Cup is held in Sharjah, UAE: India defeats Pakistan in the final.

Cycling
 Giro d'Italia won by Francesco Moser of Italy
 Tour de France – Laurent Fignon of France
 UCI Road World Championships – Men's road race – Claude Criquielion of Belgium

Dog sledding
 Iditarod Trail Sled Dog Race Champion –
 Dean Osmar wins with lead dogs: Red & Bullet

Field hockey
 Olympic Games (Men's Competition) won by Pakistan
 Olympic Games (Women's Competition) won by the Netherlands
 Men's Champions Trophy held in Karachi won by Australia
 Women's European Nations Cup held in Lille won by the Netherlands

Figure skating
 World Figure Skating Championships –
 Men's champion: Scott Hamilton, United States
 Ladies' champion: Katarina Witt, East Germany
 Pair skating champions: Barbara Underhill & Paul Martini, Canada
 Ice dancing champions: Jayne Torvill & Christopher Dean, Great Britain

Gaelic Athletic Association
 Camogie
 All-Ireland Camogie Champion: Dublin
 National Camogie League: Cork
 Gaelic football
 All-Ireland Senior Football Championship – Kerry 1-11 defeated Dublin 1-6
 National Football League – Kerry 1-11 defeated Galway 0-11
 Ladies' Gaelic football
 All-Ireland Senior Football Champion: Kerry
 National Football League: Kerry
 Hurling
 All-Ireland Senior Hurling Championship – Cork 3-16 defeated Offaly 1-12
 National Hurling League – Limerick 3–16 beat Wexford 1–9

Golf
Men's professional
 Masters Tournament – Ben Crenshaw
 U.S. Open – Fuzzy Zoeller
 British Open – Seve Ballesteros
 PGA Championship – Lee Trevino
 PGA Tour money leader – Tom Watson – $476,260
 Senior PGA Tour money leader – Don January – $328,597
Men's amateur
 British Amateur – José María Olazábal
 U.S. Amateur – Scott Verplank
Women's professional
 Nabisco Dinah Shore – Juli Inkster
 LPGA Championship – Patty Sheehan
 U.S. Women's Open – Hollis Stacy
 Classique du Maurier Classic – Juli Inkster
 LPGA Tour money leader – Betsy King – $266,771

Harness racing
 North America Cup – the inaugural event won by Legal Notice
 United States Pacing Triple Crown races –
 Cane Pace – On the Road Again
 Little Brown Jug – Colt Fortysix
 Messenger Stakes – Troublemaker
 United States Trotting Triple Crown races –
 Hambletonian – Historic Freight
 Yonkers Trot – Baltic Speed
 Kentucky Futurity – Fancy Crown
 Australian Inter Dominion Harness Racing Championship –
 Pacers: Gammalite
 Trotters: Sir Castleton

Horse racing
Steeplechases
 Cheltenham Gold Cup – Burrough Hill Lad
 Grand National – Hallo Dandy
Flat races
 Australia – Melbourne Cup won by Black Knight
 Canada – Queen's Plate won by Key to the Moon
 France – Prix de l'Arc de Triomphe won by Sagace
 Ireland – Irish Derby Stakes won by El Gran Senor
 Japan – Japan Cup won by Katsuragi Ace
 English Triple Crown Races:
 2,000 Guineas Stakes – El Gran Senor
 The Derby – Secreto
 St. Leger Stakes – Commanche Run
 United States Triple Crown Races:
 Kentucky Derby – Swale
 Preakness Stakes – Gate Dancer
 Belmont Stakes – Swale
 Breeders' Cup World Thoroughbred Championships:
 Breeders' Cup Classic – Wild Again
 Breeders' Cup Distaff – Princess Rooney
 Breeders' Cup Juvenile – Chief's Crown
 Breeders' Cup Juvenile Fillies – Outstandingly
 Breeders' Cup Mile – Royal Heroine
 Breeders' Cup Sprint – Eillo
 Breeders' Cup Turf – Lashkari

Ice hockey
 Art Ross Trophy as the NHL's leading scorer during the regular season: Wayne Gretzky, Edmonton Oilers
 Hart Memorial Trophy for the NHL's Most Valuable Player: Wayne Gretzky, Edmonton Oilers
 Stanley Cup – Edmonton Oilers won 4 games to 1 over the New York Islanders
 World Hockey Championship –
 Men's champion: (vacant) – the USSR won the Olympic Gold Medal
 Junior Men's champion: USSR defeated Finland

Motorsport

Olympic Games
 1984 Summer Olympics takes place at Los Angeles (July 28 - August 12)
 USA wins the most medals (174) and the most gold medals (83)
 1984 Winter Olympics takes place at Sarajevo (February 8 - February 19)
 USSR wins the most medals (25) and the GDR wins the most gold medals (9)

Pickleball
 U.S. Amateur Pickleball Association, now USA Pickleball, formed.

Radiosport
 Second Amateur Radio Direction Finding World Championship held in Oslo, Norway.

Rugby league
1984 National Panasonic Cup
1984 New Zealand rugby league season
1984 NSWRL season
1983–84 Rugby Football League season / 1984–85 Rugby Football League season
1984 State of Origin series

Rugby union
 90th Five Nations Championship series is won by Scotland who complete the Grand Slam

Shooting Sports
 The National Rifle Association of America takes control of the Bianchi Cup and designates it the National Action Pistol Championship

Snooker
 World Snooker Championship – Steve Davis beats Jimmy White 18-16
 World rankings – Steve Davis remains world number one for 1984/85

Swimming
 XXIII Olympic Games, held in Los Angeles (July 29 – August 4)

Tennis
 Grand Slam in tennis men's results:
 Australian Open – Mats Wilander
 French Open – Ivan Lendl
 Wimbledon – John McEnroe
 US Open – John McEnroe
 Grand Slam in tennis women's results:
 Australian Open – Chris Evert
 French Open – Martina Navratilova
 Wimbledon – Martina Navratilova
 U.S. Open – Martina Navratilova
 1984 Summer Olympics
 Men's Singles competition
 Gold – Stefan Edberg
 Silver – Francisco Maciel
 Bronze – Jimmy Arias and Paolo Canè
 Women's Singles competition
 Gold – Steffi Graf
 Silver – Sabrina Goleš
 Bronze – Raffaella Reggi and Catherine Tanvier
 1984 Davis Cup
 Sweden wins 4-1 over the United States in Men's world tennis.
 1984 Federation Cup
 Czechoslovakia wins over Australia in Women's world tennis.

Water polo
 Olympic Games (Men's Competition) won by Yugoslavia

Awards
 Associated Press Male Athlete of the Year – Carl Lewis, Track and field
 Associated Press Female Athlete of the Year – Mary Lou Retton, Gymnastics

References

 
Sports by year